Josephine Chuen-juei Ho, is the chair of the English department of
National Central University, Taiwan, and coordinator of its
Center For the Study of Sexualities.

She has withstood lawsuits directed at her outspokenness on gender and rights issues. She is one of the most known feminist scholars in Taiwan. She is called "the godmother of the Taiwanese queer movement."

Education
She holds a Bachelor of Arts degree from the National Chengchi University, a Master of Science degree from  the University of Pennsylvania, a Doctor of Education degree from the University of Georgia and a Doctor of Philosophy degree from  Indiana University.

Activism
As an activist, Ho has been drawing attention to women's rights in Taiwan since the 1990s. Though there were no laws criminalizing sexual harassment at the time, sexual assaults on women were increasingly reported in the news after the first legal case on sexual harassment was heard in 1989. In May 1994, Ho led Taiwan's first demonstration against sexual harassment, and devised its slogan, "We don’t want sexual harassment, we want orgasms. If you keep sexually harassing us, we’ll cut it off with a pair of scissors!"

Zoophilia webpage incident
In April 2003, an article appeared in the China Times claiming that Ho's website had several pages that not only covered the topic of zoophilia, but actively promoted the practice, with images. 13 conservative groups collectively filed a complaint accusing Ho of making obscenities available to children. This sensationalism led to thirteen Christian and conservative organizations collectively filing a complaint with the Taipei District Court. The process lasted for over one year, with a not guilty ruling returned on 15 September 2004, because the zoophilia pages were only one part of the website's essays and reports. Thus the incorporation of some pictures did not constitute an obscenity.

The incident has been seen as an example of sensationalist media and received international attention as a perceived confrontation between conservative aspects of Taiwanese society and sexual freedom.

Selected publications

Honors and awards
(2016) Professor Emeritus of National Central University, Taiwan.
(2005) 1000 Women for the Nobel Peace Prize
(2004) Outstanding Research Award. National Central University, Taiwan.

See also
Taiwan TG Butterfly Garden

Notes

External links

1951 births
Living people
Taiwanese women academics
21st-century Taiwanese educators
Taiwanese sexologists
Taiwanese LGBT rights activists
Sex educators
Obscenity controversies
Academic staff of the National Central University
National Chengchi University alumni
University of Pennsylvania alumni
University of Georgia alumni
Indiana University alumni
Sex-positive feminists
Taiwanese feminists
21st-century Taiwanese women writers
21st-century women educators